

The list of expeditions of Muhammad includes the expeditions undertaken by the Muslim community during the lifetime of the Islamic prophet Muhammad.

Some sources use the word ghazwa and a related plural maghazi in a narrow technical sense to refer to the expeditions in which Muhammad took part, while using the word sariyya (pl. saraya) for those early Muslim expeditions where he was not personally present. Other sources use the terms ghazwa and maghazi generically to refer to both types of expeditions.

Early Islamic sources contain significant divergences in the chronology of expeditions. Unless noted otherwise, the dates given in this list are based on Muhammad at Medina by Montgomery Watt, who in turn follows the chronology proposed by Leone Caetani.

List of expeditions 

 Type legend

References

Expeditions of Muhammad
Military expeditions
7th-century Islam
Timelines of Muslim history
Medieval Islamic world-related lists